Francisco Erandir da Silva Feitosa or simply Erandir (born August 5, 1982 in Fortaleza), is a Brazilian defensive midfielder.

Honours
Ceará State League: 2000, 2001, 2002, 2003, 2004, 2005
Brazilian League: 2001

Contract
Fortaleza (Loan) 1 January 2008 to 31 December 2008
Atlético-PR 1 January 2006 to 31 December 2009

External links
 CBF
 sambafoot.com
 rubronegro.net
 zerozero.pt

References

1982 births
Living people
Sportspeople from Fortaleza
Brazilian footballers
Campeonato Brasileiro Série A players
Campeonato Brasileiro Série B players
Campeonato Brasileiro Série C players
Fortaleza Esporte Clube players
Club Athletico Paranaense players
Atlético Clube Goianiense players
Associação Desportiva São Caetano players
Guarany Sporting Club players
Boa Esporte Clube players
Association football midfielders
Horizonte Futebol Clube players